The SStB - Gutenburg was a steam locomotive of the Südlichen Staatsbahn (SStB) or Southern National Railway of Austria-Hungary.

The locomotive was the last one ordered by the SStB. It was supplied by Georg Sigl in Vienna in 1857, and was the first locomotive he produced. The name Gutenberg refers to Johannes Gutenberg and results from the fact that Sigl originally built printing machines.

The locomotive was built in 1858 during the course of the privatization of Austrian national railways to the Südbahngesellschaft (SB) or Austrian Southern Railway, which assigned it the number 291 and the class number 12 (starting from 1864, class 17). It was retired from service in 1880.

References
 
 

Steam locomotives of Austria
Austrian Southern Railway Company steam locomotives
2-4-0 locomotives
Individual locomotives of Switzerland
Standard gauge locomotives of Austria
Railway locomotives introduced in 1857